Sporting Club Toulon is a football club from Toulon, France, that plays in the Championnat National 2, the fourth tier of the French football league system. The club was founded in 1944 and played under that name until the 1999–2000 season when they were administratively reformed as Sporting Toulon Var. In 2016, Sporting Toulon Var merged with SC Toulon-Le Las to become Sporting Club Toulon once again.

History 

Sporting Club Toulon was founded in 1944 after a merge between Sporting Club du Temple and Jeunesse Sportive Toulonnaise during the Vichy France regime.

Genesis 
After World War II it joined the French second division and left for only one season in 1946–1947. After eleven years in the second division, the club reached the highest division in France in 1959, after finishing third in the second division, but was relegated the year after.
Toulon has never won the French Cup, but has reached the semi-final on two occasions: in 1963 and 1984. Semi-finalists in 1963, Toulon was eliminated by Olympique Lyonnais. The following year, they finished fourth and were promoted again to the first division, without success.

Progression 
Relegated to the French 3rd division during 1980–1981 season, Toulon was growing stronger in the 1980s. Thanks to the effectiveness of Christian Dalger as a forward, the talent of the leader Alain Bénédet or the experience of Rolland Courbis in defence, Toulon was again promoted to the first division in 1983, finishing first in Group B, before Stade de Reims, thanks to a victory away to Grenoble (1–5).

Division 1 and decadence 
During the 1983–1984 season, Toulon stayed in Division 1 thanks to the 21 goals of Delio Onnis, top scorer in the league that season. The club again reached the semi-finals of the Coupe de France but were defeated by AS Monaco (1–4, 2–1).

The following season saw Toulon shining and beating Paris Saint-Germain 5–1. Still third after 31 matches played, they were then defeated three times in a row – including another defeat against AS Monaco at home, 1–0, in front of 18,000 spectators at Stade Mayol, which remains the best performance for the club until now. This demoted them to 5th place, but still put them in contention for qualification to European competition, going into the last game of the season. But a last defeat at home against FC Nantes Atlantique meant the club finished in 6th position, outside the European places.

In 1988, the Toulon team including Bernard Casoni, Bernard Pardo and David Ginola, with former player Rolland Courbis as coach, finished 5th in the league but failed to qualify for a European competition due to a weak UEFA coefficient at this time.

After several years of uncertainty, the club was relegated in 1993 to the Championnat National – the third level of French football – due to financial problems. The 1995–1996 season saw Toulon winning the title in National and promotion to Ligue 2. During the 16th final of the French Cup, they eliminated Girondins de Bordeaux where Zinedine Zidane was playing (3–2 et) before being beaten on penalties by Montpellier HSC in the next round. Improvements lasted only two years and in 1998, Sporting Club Toulon were relegated back to the Championnat National due to poor results, then administratively in CFA2 (5th level) and finally did not finish the championship because of liquidation.

Back to the amateur level 
After financial difficulties which led the club to be expelled from the Championship in the 1998–1999 season and to turn amateur, the club was reborn under the name "Sporting Toulon Var", gaining three promotions in four seasons to reach the third division. Candidate to access the 2nd division in 2006–2007, they have been relegated in 2007 to the French 4th division (CFA). In 2011, DNCG (Direction Nationale de Controle de Gestion) excluded the club from all national competitions and the club will start again in Division d'Honneur (6th division) in 2011–2012. A new manager Mohamed Sadani was appointed at the beginning of the 2013–14 season, and after several years struggling in Division d'Honneur, the club won the championship and finally gained promotion to CFA 2, 5th national level.

Merger and return to old name 
In February 2016, the club announced a merger with SC Toulon-Le Las, of the CFA. The new club would take the historic name Sporting Club Toulon and play in CFA, with the reserves in CFA2. In 2019 the club won promotion from National 2 as champion of their group. They were relegated the following year after being placed bottom of the league when the 2019–20 Championnat National season was ended prematurely due to the COVID-19 pandemic.

Honours 
Ligue 2
Winners (1): 1983
Championnat National
Winners (1): 1996
Coupe de France
Semi-finalists (2): 1963, 1984
Coupe Gambardella
Runners-up (1): 1966

Current squad

Managers

References 

 
Association football clubs established in 1944
1944 establishments in France
Sport in Toulon
Football clubs in Provence-Alpes-Côte d'Azur
Ligue 1 clubs